The Colombian national rugby league team represents Colombia in the sport of rugby league.

History
The first rugby league team representing Colombia was organized by the Australian-based Latin Heat Rugby League organization in 2016, with a team of Colombian expats taking part in various competitions and small-sided matches against other teams representing Latin American nations. The first Colombian rugby league team, the Nativos, was established in the city of Antofagasta, Chile in 2017. Colombia made their international rugby league debut in the inaugural Latin American Rugby League Championships held in Los Ángeles, Chile in November 2017, losing 36-6 to Argentina in the first RLIF-sanctioned international on South American soil.

Current squad
vs South American Championship
Andres Jimenez
Leonardo Delgado
William Martinez
Daniel Medina
Jessua Guillot
Andrew Zuluaga
John Garcia
Juan David Espinal
Sebastian Martinez
Fredy Diaz
Rafael Lopez
Hector Linares
Carlos Mendoza
Nelson Parada
David Perez
Jesus Delgado
Jean Villamil
Sebastian Rodger
Ruben Zequeda

References

South American national rugby league teams
R
National rugby league teams